Hoogerwerf's pheasant (Lophura inornata hoogerwerfi), also known as the Aceh pheasant or Sumatran pheasant is a medium-sized, up to  long, bird of the family Phasianidae. The name commemorates the Dutch ornithologist and taxidermist Andries Hoogerwerf.

Description
The male is a crestless bluish-black pheasant with bare red facial skin, short tail and grey legs. The female is a rufous brown bird with a dark bluish grey legs and short dark tail. Its appearance resembles, and it is usually considered as a subspecies of the Salvadori's pheasant. The female is different from the latter for having darker brown, lack of buff mottling and plainer plumage.

Distribution and habitat
An Indonesian endemic, this little-known pheasant inhabits to mid-mountain forests of Gunung Leuser National Park in Aceh province. Previously known only from two female specimens, it was recently discovered in a market in Medan, North Sumatra.

References

External links 
 Red Data Book

Hoogerwerf's pheasant
Subspecies
Birds of Sumatra
Endemic fauna of Sumatra
Hoogerwerf's pheasant
Hoogerwerf's pheasant